Yongdeng County is a county of Gansu Province, China, it is under the administration of the prefecture-level city of Lanzhou, the capital of Gansu. Its postal code is 730300, and its population in 2020 was 520,000 people, of which 454,000 lived in rural communities and 4.5% were minorities.

The county has been inhabited since the neolithic era, and has been inhabited by the Majiayao culture and Banpo culture.

The economy of Yongdeng County is mainly dependent on agriculture. The Kushui rose, named after Kushui town in Yongdeng, is known throughout China, and is used in a variety of products such as tea, wine, sauce, snacks, candy, cigarettes, soap, perfume and cosmetics. 70% of the national production of this flower originates from Yongdeng County, which led to Yongdeng being known as the 'land of roses'. Other agricultural produce from Yongdeng include grapes, trout, mutton and various vegetables.

Administrative divisions
Yongdeng County is subdivided in 13 towns, 3 townships and 11 residential communities.
Towns

Townships
 Pingcheng Township()
 Minle Township()
 Qishan Township()

Climate

Transport 
China National Highway 312
G30 Lianyungang–Khorgas Expressway
Lanxin Railway
Lanzhou-Zhongchuan Airport Intercity Railway

References

  Official website (Chinese)

See also
 List of administrative divisions of Gansu

Yongdeng County
Geography of Lanzhou